Aukside is a small village in County Durham, in England. It is situated on the north side of Teesdale, a short distance from Middleton-in-Teesdale. It was originally called Hawk Side. This can be seen in early ordnance survey maps.

References

External links

Villages in County Durham